Linda Joy McQuaig is a Canadian journalist, columnist, non-fiction author and social critic. She is best known for her series of best-selling books that challenge the dominant free-market economic ideology of recent decades. Her books make the case for a more egalitarian distribution of power, income and wealth. The National Post newspaper has described McQuaig as "Canada's Michael Moore".

In October 2016, one of McQuaig's books, Shooting the Hippo: Death by Deficit and other Canadian Myths, was named by the Literary Review of Canada as one of the 25 most influential Canadian books of the past 25 years.

Early years and personal life

McQuaig was born in September 1951 to a middle-class Toronto family that she has described as opinionated and interested in politics. Her father Jack, who she has called "politically conservative but with a strong sense of social justice", is founder of the McQuaig Institute of Executive Development and has written a half-dozen books on leadership and personal development. McQuaig's mother Audrey was also trained as a psychologist, but gave up her career to raise McQuaig, her sister Wendy and brothers Peter, Don and John.

From the ages of seven to nine, McQuaig wrote and published the one-page DeVere Weekly, a newspaper named after the street in Toronto on which her family lived. From 1963 to 1970 McQuaig attended Branksome Hall, a Toronto private girls school where she became president of the debating society and twice led her school to victory at the Ridley invitational debating tournament, and from which she graduated with the Governor General's medal for academic achievement. Later she attended the University of Toronto, where she worked for the student newspaper The Varsity and served as co-editor in chief with Thomas Walkom.
McQuaig graduated the University of Toronto in 1974 with a BA, specializing in History and Political Theory.

In the 1970s McQuaig and four friends co-owned a house they called The Pit in Toronto's east end, where they hosted frequent house parties and dinners for friends in academia, media and the arts. In 1976 she lived for a year in Paris, where she learned French and wrote a never-published novel. In the mid-eighties McQuaig and two female friends created The Make-Out Game, a boardgame she has described as "a satire on the different ways men and women approach sex." In the early nineties she married criminal defence lawyer Fred Fedorsen, with whom she has a daughter, Amy. The marriage ended in 1994.

Career

McQuaig first worked as a journalist while a student at University of Toronto, initially writing and then co-editing, The Varsity, a year in each role.  In 1974 she was hired as a full-time reporter by The Globe and Mail newspaper. In 1977 she became a story producer for CBC Radio's As It Happens. In 1979 she went to Tehran to freelance for the CBC, The Globe and Mail and Maclean's magazine, covering the aftermath of the Iranian revolution that overthrew the Shah. In 1981 she joined Maclean's as a senior writer, and in 1982 took a leave of absence to cover the 1982 Lebanon War from Lebanon, Israel and the West Bank.

In 1983 McQuaig wrote a two-part piece for Maclean's with its then-assistant business editor Ian Austen investigating whether Canadian financier Conrad Black had tried to inappropriately influence the Attorney General of Ontario to stop an investigation into his attempted takeover of Ohio-based Hanna Mining Company. Years later, Black described McQuaig in his Toronto Sun column as a "weedy and not very bright leftist reporter" who writes "sophomoric, soporiferous left-wing books", and told host Peter Gzowski on CBC Radio that McQuaig deserved to be "horsewhipped". Later McQuaig was retained as a freelance columnist for Black's National Post newspaper.

In 1984, McQuaig returned to the Globe as a political reporter, where she first came to national prominence in 1989 for uncovering the Patti Starr affair, in which former Ontario Place CEO Patti Starr was found to have illegally used charitable funds to make political donations, and for which McQuaig was awarded a Centre for Investigative Journalism Award and a National Newspaper Award.

In 1991, she was awarded an Atkinson Fellowship in Public Policy to study the social welfare systems in Europe and North America. This resulted in the Atkinson Foundation publishing, in 1992, a 51-page special report by McQuaig called Canada's Social Programs: Under Attack.

Since 1992 McQuaig has written an op-ed column in the Toronto Star and has supported herself through a combination of freelance writing, speaking engagements and royalties from her books.

Federal politics
On 6 August 2013, McQuaig announced that she would seek the nomination of the New Democratic Party to run in the pending Toronto Centre by-election. On 15 September she won the nomination on the first ballot. The election to replace Bob Rae was won by Liberal Chrystia Freeland. McQuaig ran again in the 2015 federal election losing to Liberal Bill Morneau. During that campaign, she was denounced by Prime Minister Stephen Harper after she stated on a CBC-TV program that much of the oil from the Athabasca oil sands would have to be left in the ground if Canada was to meet its climate change targets.

Themes
McQuaig is best known for her series of books and newspaper columns that describe how the corporate elite has managed to shape government economic and social policy in ways that have harmed the public interest.

Her first book, Behind Closed Doors (1987), relates the history of the fight over tax policy in Canada, detailing how members of the financial elite have effectively maintained and extended control over the country’s tax policy, to their own benefit.

The Quick and the Dead (1991) relates the story behind the Free Trade Agreement between Canada and the United States, and its negative impact on Canada.

Her best-selling 1993 book The Wealthy Banker's Wife compared the social welfare systems of Europe with those of the United States, and showed how Canada, traditionally in the middle between the two extremes, was increasingly veering towards the US model.

Her 1995 book, Shooting the Hippo, topped The Globe and Mail national best-seller list for more than two months. It argued that politicians and the business community had misled the Canadian public with claims that rising social spending was driving up the national deficit, thereby requiring the government to slash social spending. The book disputed the seriousness of the deficit and argued that the deficit's prime cause was the Bank of Canada’s radical anti-inflation policy, which had dramatically pushed up interest rates and driven the country into recession."

The Cult of Impotence (1998) disputed the notion that countries had no alternative but to submit to corporate demands for deep tax cuts and reduced social spending—or wealth-holders would move their capital offshore. She noted that, in the postwar era, countries had created international financial rules that prevented excessive capital mobility, and that such restraints were still possible in the modern global economy. What had changed wasn’t so much the technology but the political insistence of corporate interests on getting their way.

In All You Can Eat (2001), McQuaig looked at how the new international financial rules and trade deals were ensconcing a radical form of capitalism, leading to deep inequality and the disempowerment of the people. Drawing on the work of economic historian and anthropologist Karl Polanyi, McQuaig described how the new capitalism was not part of a natural evolution but rather a deliberately imposed redesign of society at odds with the basic human need for community.

It's The Crude, Dude: War, Big Oil and the Fight for the Planet (2004) looked at how the quest for oil has long shaped US foreign policy, culminating in George W Bush’s invasion of Iraq, even as global warming was making it imperative for the world to curb oil consumption.

It's the Crude, Dude: Greed, Gas, War and the American Way (2006) is a version of McQuaig's 2004 book with added information relating to the U.S.

In Holding the Bully's Coat: Canada and the US Empire (2007), McQuaig argues that Canada should stop supporting the US in its role as an imperial power.

In The Trouble with Billionaires (2010), McQuaig and co-author Neil Brooks, a professor of tax policy at Osgoode Hall Law School in Toronto, examined the rise of the billionaire class and its negative impact on society, and argued for a much more progressive tax system.

Billionaires' Ball: Gluttony and Hubris in an Age of Epic Inequality (2012) is a version of The Trouble with Billionaires with an emphasis on economic policies in the U.S.

McQuaig's newspaper columns focus on issues like the importance of maintaining a strong social safety net, and on the detrimental effects of privatization, trade and globalization, and the influence of money in politics.

Books

 1987 – Behind Closed Doors: How the Rich Won Control of Canada's Tax System ... And Ended Up Richer – Toronto: Penguin Books; 
 1991 – The Quick and the Dead: Brian Mulroney, Big Business and the Seduction of Canada – Toronto: Penguin Books; 
 1993 – The Wealthy Banker's Wife: The Assault on Equality in Canada – Toronto: Penguin Books – 
 1995 – Shooting the Hippo: Death by Deficit and Other Canadian Myths – Toronto: Penguin Books; 
 1998 – The Cult of Impotence: Selling the Myth of Powerlessness in the Global Economy – Toronto: Penguin Books; 
 2001 – All You Can Eat: Greed, Lust and the New Capitalism – Toronto: Penguin Books; 
 2004 – It's the Crude, Dude: War, Big Oil and the Fight for the Planet – Toronto: Doubleday Canada; 
 2006 – It's the Crude, Dude: Greed, Gas, War and the American Way – New York: St. Martin's Press; 
 2007 – Holding the Bully's Coat: Canada and the U.S. Empire – Toronto: Doubleday Canada; 
 2010 – The Trouble with Billionaires (co-authored with Neil Brooks) – Toronto: Viking Canada; 
 2012 – Billionaires' Ball: Gluttony and Hubris in an Age of Epic Inequality (co-authored with Neil Brooks) – Boston: Beacon Press; 
2019 - The Sport and Prey of Capitalists: How the Rich Are Stealing Canada's Public Wealth - Toronto: Dundurn Press;

In popular culture
In the CBC TV comedy The Newsroom, she played herself as a guest to discuss her book Shooting the Hippo. This led to this exchange:
George Findlay (News Director, played by Ken Finkleman): "(Shooting the Hippo I loved that book)...what does it mean?"
McQuaig:  "I actually explained that in the opening line of the book."

Followed by another:
Jim Walcott (Anchor, played by Peter Keleghan): "I really liked the title of your book "Shooting the Hippo", but don't you think you would've sold more copies if you had a picture of a dead hippo on the cover?"

References

External links

Linda McQuaig's author website
Linda McQuaig archives are held at the Clara Thomas Archives and Special Collections, York University Libraries, Toronto, Ontario
Linda McQuaig audio interview, 14 May 2007
TV interview: Linda McQuaig, The Trouble with Philanthropists, December, 2010; 25 minutes
Linda McQuaig "Making Waves" speech to the Council of Canadians, 26 October 2012; 26 minutes
Linda McQuaig's op-eds on Common Dreams, reprinted from the Toronto Star

1951 births
Living people
Canadian political journalists
Canadian columnists
University of Toronto alumni
Toronto Star people
Canadian women journalists
National Post people
Canadian women columnists
Writers from Toronto
New Democratic Party candidates for the Canadian House of Commons
Canadian women non-fiction writers
Canadian social commentators
Centre for Investigative Journalism Award winners